The Oban Hills are a range of hills in Cross River State, Nigeria.
They lie within the Oban Hills Division of the Cross River National Park.

Geography
The soils are highly vulnerable to leaching and erosion where stripped of plant cover.
The rainy season lasts from March to November, with annual rainfall of over 3,500 mm.

The northern part is drained by the Cross River and its tributaries.
The southern parts are drained by the Calabar, Kwa and Korup rivers.

Land use

The Oban hills, which take their name from the small town of Oban to the south, contain the largest area of unexploited lowland rain forest in Nigeria.
It is possible that at one time the region was home to more people, perhaps being depopulated due to its proximity to the slave trading center of Calabar, and that the forest may actually be fairly recent growth.
A 1988 report said that the remaining patches of forest on mountainous slopes were being encroached upon for logging and farming. Primates such as Preuss's guenon were being hunted for meat.
The Oban Hills Forest Reserve was made a part of the Cross River National Park in 1991.

References

Sources

Mountain ranges of Nigeria
World Heritage Sites in Nigeria